Nikos Tzemanakis also known as DJ Bobito, Beat-Les and MajorKeys is a DJ, record producer, songwriter and entrepreneur of Cretan origin based in Athens, Greece. He is widely known for his song “El Telephone” featuring Eleni Foureira which peaked at the no.1 spot on the Greek national music chart and became double platinum in Greece. His song "Miss You" which was released in 2011, has been featured in Buddha Bar compilation albums in 2014. Bobito has collaborated with multiple musicians including Claydee, Josephine, Lefteris Pantazis, Barrice, Demy, Vegas and several others. He is currently signed with the Greek record label .

Early life
Bobito was born in Athens, Greece. He attended Technological Educational Institute of Piraeus where he studied electronics. Later, he attended SAE Institute in Athens where he studied electronic music production at the same time he studied classical piano at Conservatory of Vari.

Career
Bobito started his professional career in the mid-2000s as a resident DJ at some of the prominent nightclubs in Athens. In 2011, Bobito wrote and produced "Miss You (Son Of The Sun)" for the Greek artist Alexandros Christopoulos. The same year, he produced the official remix of Vegas (band)' song "Fili" which was released on Warner Music.

Bobito collaborated with Claydee for "Mamacita Buena (System B & MV Mars Remix)" which was released by Ultra Records in 2012. "Miss You" was re-released in the early 2014 on one of the largest compilation album worldwide, Buddha Bar. Later that year, Bobito collaborated with Lefteris Pantazis and co-wrote the song "Erotas", the single was released by Heaven Music. By 2022, the song had garnered over 6 million views on YouTube.

In the late 2014, Bobito released his first single Kati Na Nioso featuring the Greek pop artist Josephine. The single was released by Panik Records. Between 2015 and 2016, he collaborated with Barrice and Demy and released three official remixes including "Rodino Oneiro", "Zitima Zois Kai Thanatou " and "Epimeno". During those years, Bobito released his second single "Agapi Mono" featuring Barrice on Spider Music. The single received positive reviews from several music news outlets. In May 2016, Bobito was invited as a judge and coach at Amita Motion Positive Battles where he worked till 2022.

In 2018, Bobito performed during Colour Day Festival held at the Athens Olympic Sports Complex. He became the resident DJ at the Colour Day Festival in 2019 and performed live act with Lila Trianti. Later that year, he also performed at Dreamland Festival which was also held at the Athens Olympic Sports Complex.

In 2020, Bobito co-founded Major Studios, a music production company. The same year he launched his record label Zebra Records in collaboration with DJ Paco.

In 2022, "El Telephone" featuring Bobito and Eleni Foureira was released on Panik Records. Bobito produced and co-wrote the song. "El Telephone" reached the top spot at the Greek national music chart and became double platinum in Greece. The same year, Bobito composed the remixed version of the song which also reached the no. 1 spot on the Greek charts. Also in 2022, he wrote and produced "Sentoni" by Giorgos Livanis which was released on Panik Records.

During his career as a musician, Bobito has performed all over Greece as well as in the countries like Bulgaria, Romania, Germany and United Kingdom. He has also opened for some of the international artists such as  Flo Rida, Stromae,  The Asteroids Galaxy Tour, Kiko Navarro, Kenny Carpenter, Bang La Decks and Rouls and Doors.

Discography

Singles

Music Videos

Live performances

References

External links
Official website

Musicians from Athens
Greek songwriters
Greek record producers
Panik Records artists
21st-century Greek singers
Year of birth missing (living people)
Living people